The Men's 400 meter Race at the IPC Athletics Asia-Oceania Championship 2016 was held at the Dubai Police Club Stadium in Dubai from 7–12 March.

Results
Legend

AS: Asian Record

WR: World Record

PB: Personal Best

SB: Season Best

Fn-False Start

Q- Qualified for Finals

q- Qualified for Finals as per best performance

DNF- Did Not Finish

DSQ- Disqualified

T12

Final
Date- 08:March:2016
Time- 17:03

T13

Final
Date- 12:March:2016
Time- 18:52

T20

Heat
Date- 10:March:2016
Time- 18:26

Final

T34

Final

T36/37

Final

T38

Final

T44

Final

T47

Heat

Final

T53

Final

T54

Final

References

IPC Athletics Asia-Oceania Championship 2016